Buster B. Jones (August 24, 1959 - February 2, 2009) was an American guitarist specializing in the fingerpicking style.

Biography
Born Bradley F. Jones in Ames, Iowa, he first became known after entering Guitar Player Magazine's International Reader's Soundpage Competition in 1988 on a whim. He submitted an original composition, titled Back Porch Boogie, as well as a cover of Salty Dog Blues, recorded using a reel-to-reel recorder and then transferred to cassette using a boombox. Jones came in first place out of nearly 900 entries. He went on to win the National Fingerpicking Championship at Winfield, Kansas in 1990.

In 1995, Jones became a spokesman for Godin guitars, playing a custom instrument he named "Pearl" for the mother of pearl inlay of his name on the neck. He toured often, earning the nicknames "Le Machine Gun" and "Pistola" for his fast playing style. That same style earned the notice of Chet Atkins, who described Buster by saying; "Buster B. Jones is the best fingerpicker I've heard since Jerry Reed… He plays like he's double parked."

Jones was also well known for his mentoring of young players and he appeared in 11 instructional videos demonstrating and explaining fingerstyle guitar technique.

Discography

Albums

Solo

Duet

DVDs

Songbooks

References

External links
 Guitar tabs of Buster B. Jones

1959 births
2009 deaths
20th-century American guitarists
Guitarists from Iowa
American male guitarists
20th-century American male musicians